The 2020–21 Wisconsin Badgers men's basketball team represented the University of Wisconsin–Madison in the 2020–21 NCAA Division I men's basketball season. The Badgers were led by sixth-year head coach Greg Gard and will played their home games at the Kohl Center in Madison, Wisconsin as members of the Big Ten Conference. They finished the season 18–13, 10–10 in Big Ten play to finish in a tie for sixth place. As the No. 6 seed in the Big Ten tournament, they defeated Penn State before losing to Iowa in the quarterfinals. They received an at-large bid to the NCAA tournament as the No. 9 seed in the South region. They defeated North Carolina in the first round before losing to No. 1-seeded (and eventual national champion) Baylor in the second round.

Previous season
The Badgers finished the 2019–20 season 21–10, 14–6 in Big Ten play to finish tied for first place winning them a share of the Big Ten championship. The 2020 Big Ten men's basketball tournament and 2020 NCAA Division I men's basketball tournament were cancelled due to the COVID-19 pandemic.

Offseason

Departures

2020 recruiting class

2021 Recruiting class

Roster

Schedule and results

|-
!colspan=12 style=|Non-conference regular season

|-                                 
!colspan=9 style=|Big Ten regular season

|-
!colspan=9 style=|Big Ten tournament

|-
!colspan=9 style=|NCAA tournament

Rankings

*AP does not release post-NCAA Tournament rankings^Coaches did not release a Week 1 poll.

Player statistics

References

Wisconsin Badgers men's basketball seasons
Wisconsin
Badgers men's basketball team
Badgers men's basketball team
Wisconsin